Golra Sharif Junction Railway Station (Urdu and ) is located on Golra road in Islamabad, Pakistan. It is part of  Pakistan Railways.  The Golra Sharif Railway Museum is located at this station.

The station lies on the main line of the Pakistan Railways, which connects the rest of the country in the south and Peshawar in the north. More than 20 trains pass through this station every day. It is situated southwest of Islamabad, the capital of Pakistan, at the altitude of 1994 feet. The building has Victorian architecture and comprises five hall-like rooms constructed in yellow stone masonry. The station originally linked Peshawar, Kohat, Havelian, and Multan. It now enjoys more importance due to the presence of its museum.

History
The station was established in 1882 and upgraded to a railroad junction in 1912. It was part of the British logistics artery during the Afghan military campaigns at the turn of the twentieth century. It has since become part of an important trade route which runs into Afghanistan through the Khyber Pass.

See also
 List of railway stations in Pakistan

References

Railway stations in Islamabad Capital Territory
Railway stations opened in 1881
Railway stations on Karachi–Peshawar Line (ML 1)
Railway stations on Khushalgarh–Kohat–Thal Railway